Novika (Katarzyna Nowicka; born 1974) is a Polish vocalist, DJ, and producer. She plays a blend of electro music, deep house, deep techno, and dubtronica.

She is known for her numerous collaborations with Futro, Smolik, Fisz, Vienio & Pele, Adamus and others, all of whom appeared on her album "Feat. Novika" (Sissy, 2004). In Radiostacja she hosted her show "Radio Lazy Sunday" for 5 years. Then she moved to Jazz Radio for a while and ended up in national radio for young people - BIS. Here she serves lazy and experimental electronic sounds and presents new local talents. She supports Polish artists and DJs also through compilations (Radio Leniwa Niedziela, Sissy 2002; Polskie Leniwe, Kayax 2005).

Novika has founded a DJ collective and record label called Beats Friendly.

She has performed at major Polish festivals (Astigmatic, Heineken Open'er, Era New Horizons), in Paris (Closing of Polish Year in France) and Japan (Expo).

Discography

References

External links
 Official website
 Beats Friendly

1974 births
Living people
Dubtronica musicians
Polish electronic musicians
21st-century Polish singers
21st-century Polish women singers